Thorneloe University, also known as Thorneloe University at Laurentian, is an Anglican affiliated university formerly federated with, and still inset on the campus of, the larger Laurentian University in Sudbury, Ontario, Canada.

Programs
The university offers programs in fine arts including music (in conjunction with Laurentian University), theatre performance, theatre production (in conjunction with Cambrian College) and film production, religious studies, classical studies, women's studies and theatre arts. Thorneloe University also offers a certificate, diploma, and bachelor's degree in theology.

Faculty 
 The president and provost of Thorneloe University is the Rev. Dr John Gibaut.
The chancellor of Thorneloe is Archbishop Anne Germond.
 The Chair of Ancient Studies and Classical Studies is Aven McMaster.
 The Chair of Religious Studies is David Humbert.
 The Chair of Theatre and Motion Picture Arts is Ian Maclennan.
 The Supervisor of the Motion Picture Arts curriculum is B. P. Paquette, M.F.A.
 The Coordinator of the Bachelor of Fine Arts Program is Patricia Tedford, M.F.A.

Facilities 

In addition to classroom, administrative and faculty offices, Thorneloe University houses a 143-seat theatre and a 58-room student residence.

Fielding Memorial Chapel of St. Mark 
The Fielding Memorial Chapel of St. Mark is a Chapel located on the site of Thorneloe.  Designed by Townend Stefura Baleshta Architects (now Yallowega Bélanger Salach Architecture), construction was completed in 1968 by Neil Smith Construction Ltd. From September to April, the chapel is used as a place of Anglican worship at noon on Thursdays. Some professors decide to use the space for teaching their courses, or host performances from Thorneloe's theatre and acting programs. In 2017, it received both the Ontario Association of Architects Landmark Award and heritage building status from the city of Greater Sudbury.

References

External links
 

Laurentian University
Educational institutions established in 1960
Buildings and structures in Greater Sudbury
1960 establishments in Ontario
Anglican universities and colleges